Xiaoguan Subdistrict is a subdistrict on the northwest of Chaoyang District, Beijing, China. It borders Taiyanggong Township to the East, Heping Street Subdistrict to the south, Yayuncun Subdistrict to the west, and Datun Subdistrict to the north. As of 2020, it has a total population of 61,966.

This district's name, Xiaoguan came from the fact that there used to be a checkpoint within the area.

History 
In 1975, Deqing Road Subdistrict was created within this area, and the name was changed to Xiaoguan Subdistrict 3 years later. In 1987, the land of what would become Anzhen Subdistrict was separated from the subdistrict.

Administrative Division 
At the end of 2021, there are a total of 8 communities under Xiaoguan Subdistrict:

External Link 
Official Website (Archived)

References 

Chaoyang District, Beijing